La Count Mountain is a mostly ice-free mountain,  high, forming the northern portion of the Battleship massif, located between Rotunda Glacier, Blankenship Glacier, and Ferrar Glacier in Victoria Land, Antarctica. The mountain was studied by geologist Warren Hamilton of the United States Geological Survey during the 1958–59 season. It was named in 1992 by the Advisory Committee on Antarctic Names after Ronald La Count, Manager of the Polar Operations Section, Division of Polar Programs, at the National Science Foundation, 1984–90.

References

Mountains of Victoria Land
Scott Coast